Alexander Gehbauer (born 24 April 1990) is an Austrian cross-country mountain biker. At the 2012 Summer Olympics, he competed in the Men's cross-country at Hadleigh Farm, finishing in 9th place.  At the 2016 Summer Olympics, he failed to finish.

Major results

Mountain bike
2010
 1st  National Under-23 XCO Championships
2012
 1st  National XCO Championships
 4th UCI Under-23 XCO World Championships
2013
 1st  National XCO Championships

Cyclo-cross
2014–2015
 1st  National Championships
2015–2016
 1st  National Championships

References

External links

Austrian male cyclists
Cross-country mountain bikers
1990 births
Living people
Olympic cyclists of Austria
Cyclists at the 2012 Summer Olympics
Cyclists at the 2016 Summer Olympics
People from Bergstraße (district)
Sportspeople from Darmstadt (region)
Austrian mountain bikers